Valdebernardo is a station on line 9 of Madrid Metro which runs under Indalecio Prieto Boulevard, in the Vicálvaro district of Madrid district. It is located in fare Zone A.

The station opened its doors on 1 December 1998. The project leaders rejected the original name "Lucio de Mingo" (a war hero to some) because of possible conflicts. Valdebernardo, the name eventually chosen, translates to "Bernardo's Valley" and refers to the Barcelonian Bernardo Gomez, ancestor of the landlord.

Metro Valdebernardo is special in the way its exits are located at the end of the spacious platforms and not, as is usual for most single-line stations, in hallways that branch off to the sides. Due to the station having been built underneath a green strip in the middle of the central road of the neighbourhood, it also has skylights.

References 

Line 9 (Madrid Metro) stations
Buildings and structures in Vicálvaro District, Madrid
Railway stations in Spain opened in 1998